Oliver Lampe (born 9 April 1974 in Hannover, Niedersachsen) is a former butterfly and freestyle swimmer from Germany, who represented his native country at the 1996 Summer Olympics in Atlanta, Georgia.

There he swam in the preliminary heats of the Men's 4×200 m freestyle relay, which eventually won the bronze medal in the final. A member of Sportverein Arpke he is the son of 1972 Olympian Werner Lampe, and a nephew of Hans Lampe.

External links
 

1974 births
Living people
German male swimmers
German male butterfly swimmers
Olympic swimmers of Germany
Swimmers at the 1996 Summer Olympics
Olympic bronze medalists for Germany
Sportspeople from Hanover
Olympic bronze medalists in swimming
German male freestyle swimmers
World Aquatics Championships medalists in swimming
European Aquatics Championships medalists in swimming
Medalists at the 1996 Summer Olympics
Universiade medalists in swimming
Universiade silver medalists for Germany
Universiade bronze medalists for Germany
20th-century German people
21st-century German people